Adicocrita is a genus of moths in the family Geometridae described by Prout in 1930.

Species
Adicocrita araria Guenée, [1858] (type species as Racheospila araria Guenée, 1857)
Adicocrita discerpta Walker, F., 1861
Adicocrita koranata Felder & Rogenhofer, 1875
Adicocrita aciculata Herbulot, 1983

References

Geometrinae
Geometridae genera